Road 44 is a major road in Iran linking Tehran and Mashhad. This road is mostly an Expressway and is a part of the Asian Highway 1 route. This road is one of the most important and strategic main roads of the country since it connects the traffic of the north-eastern provinces of the country to the central provinces and the capital, Tehran.

Gallery

References

External links 

 Iran road map on Young Journalists Club

AH1
44
Transport in Tehran
Transportation in Tehran Province
Transportation in Semnan Province
Transportation in Razavi Khorasan Province